Tteok-kkochi ("rice cakes skewer") is a popular South Korean street food consisting of skewered and fried tteok (rice cakes) brushed with spicy gochujang-based sauce.

Etymology
Tteok means rice cakes, and kkochi means food on skewers or skewers themselves used for culinary purposes.

References

Skewered foods
Street food in South Korea
South Korean cuisine
Tteok
Bunsik